The 1973–74 Tercera División season is the 40th since its establishment.

League tables

Group I

Group II

Group III

Group IV

Promotion playoff

Relegation playoff

Season records
 Most wins: 24, Cultural Leonesa, Alavés and Eibar.
 Most draws: 16, Hellín.
 Most losses: 26, Osasuna Promesas.
 Most goals for: 67, Alavés.
 Most goals against: 83, Melilla Industrial.
 Most points: 57, Cultural Leonesa.
 Fewest wins: 4, Osasuna Promesas.
 Fewest draws: 4, Getxo, Eibar, Palencia and Tortosa.
 Fewest losses: 4, Recreativo de Huelva.
 Fewest goals for: 22, Tolosa.
 Fewest goals against: 21, Alavés.
 Fewest points: 16, Osasuna Promesas.

Notes

External links
RSSSF 
Futbolme 

Tercera División seasons
3
Spain